Kaonik is a village in the municipality of Busovača, Bosnia and Herzegovina.

Demographics 
According to the 2013 census, its population was 380.

References

Populated places in Busovača